AEA International Lawyers Network, previously known as European Lawyers Association, is an international network of offices situated all over the world. The AEA covers all the 193 UN member countries plus one UN observer (Palestine) and two UN non-members (Taiwan and Kosovo).

Congress 
All the Association members meet annually in a Congress. Until now, 10 International Congresses have been celebrated. The first International Congress was held in Madrid in September 2005. The second took place in Paris in 2006. The third was in Madrid in May 2008. The fourth was in May 2009 in Berlin. The fifth was in Rome in May 2010. The sixth was celebrated in Istanbul in June 2011. The seventh was in Saint Petersburg in May 2012. The eighth was in Mexico D.F. in May 2013. The ninth was in Amsterdam in October 2013. In the tenth Anniversary the AEA Congress was held in Athens on the 21 and 22 May 2014. The next Congress will be celebrated in Lisbon on 28 and 29 May 2015.

The celebration place is decided democratically during the previous Congress.  The countries who wish to hold a Congress, make a public exposition presenting their office using videos, photographs, and a specifics proposals about their Congress. Thereby, it becomes an exposition like if it was a candidacy to the Olympic Games. During the last vote celebrated in Athens in May 2014, Lisbon, Jerusalem, Prague, Rabat and Victoria Falls were presented as candidates. The finalists were Lisbon and Jerusalem, with Lisbon the eventual winner, so they will hold the 2015 Congress. The next voting for the 2016 Congress will take place in Lisbon in May 2015.

Offices number 
Nowadays, the AEA is formed by 2.435 offices. The country with most offices is the United States. The US is followed in numbers by Germany and France. In Spain, there is also a strong office presence and practically all the provinces are covered and working mandatorily with the AEA brand.

Democratic organization 
The AEA has a fully democratic structure. The president and the other members of the Directors Board will be chosen via member votes. The voting takes place annually at the Congress.
The president is the lawyer Pedro Beltrán. The Board of Directors is formed by six Vice-presidents and eight other members representing different geographic areas.

References 

http://www.diarioinformacion.com/secciones/noticiaOpinion.jsp?pRef=2008050200_8_749978__Opinion-determinadotipo-capitalismo 
http://www.diarioinformacion.com/alicante/2008/06/07/audiencia-propone-grabar-menores-victimas-delitos-vayan-juicio/763444.html
http://medias.diarioinformacion.com/suplementos/2007-06-26_SUP_2007-06-19_02_37_31_juntos.pdf

International law organizations